The Greatest Love Songs of All Time is a studio album by American singer Barry Manilow, released on January 26, 2010 through Arista.

Commercial and chart performance
The album debuted on the Billboard 200 album chart at #5, but dropped in its second week to #40.
The album also debuted in the UK charts at #26.
This album also received a Grammy nomination in the category Best Traditional Pop Vocal Album.

Track listing

References

2010 albums
Barry Manilow albums
Covers albums
Albums produced by Clive Davis
Arista Records albums